Christos Retsos (born 2 May 2001) is a Greek professional footballer who plays as a midfielder. He is currently playing for Aris Petroupoli F.C..
He formerly represented  
Panionios 2019–20 Super League Greece; Rodos Super League Greece 2; Kavala 2021–22 Super League Greece 2; Irodotos F.C. Super League Greece 2.

Personal life
Born in South Africa to Greek father and Hungarian mother, Retsos moved to Greece in his teenage years. He is the younger cousin of fellow footballer, Panagiotis Retsos.

References

2001 births
Living people
Greek footballers
South African people of Greek descent
Naturalized citizens of Greece
Super League Greece players
Panionios F.C. players
Association football midfielders